The Kuala Kangsar District is a district in Perak, Malaysia. Kuala Kangsar shares its borders with Larut, Matang and Selama at the west, Hulu Perak at the north, Gua Musang of Kelantan at the east, Kinta at the south, Perak Tengah and Manjung at the southwest. The seat of this district is the town of Kuala Kangsar.

Administrative divisions

Kuala Kangsar District is divided into 9 mukims, which are:
 Chegar Galah
 Kampung Buaia
 Kota Lama Kanan
 Kota Lama Kiri
 Lubuk Merbau
 Pulau Kamiri
 Sayong
 Senggang
 Sungai Siput

Demographics 

The following is based on Department of Statistics Malaysia 2010 census.

Federal Parliament and State Assembly Seats 
List of Kuala Kangsar district representatives in the Federal Parliament (Dewan Rakyat)

List of Kuala Kangsar district representatives in the State Legislative Assembly.

See also

 Districts of Malaysia

References